Wallisia lindeniana is a species of flowering plant in the genus Wallisia. It is endemic to Ecuador.

Cultivars
 Tillandsia 'Caeca'
 Tillandsia 'Duvaliana'
 Tillandsia 'Duvalii'
 Tillandsia 'Emilie'
 Tillandsia 'Pink Plume'

References

Tillandsioideae
Endemic flora of Ecuador
Plants described in 1868